Daldal is a romantic social Pakistani drama aired on Hum TV. It stars Zahid Ahmed, Armeena Khan, Muneeb Butt and Kinza Hashmi in lead roles. Daldal reflects on the evil practices of society and illegal immigration

Plot 

The story revolves around the themes of illegal immigration, dowry and corruption (greed). Shuja (Zahid Ahmed), a member of a lower-middle-class family, dreams of going to London one day in order to escape his current unsatisfactory life. Shuja's mother, Sakeena (Asma Abbas) is an extremely greedy person, and wants Shuja to marry a rich woman who'd be able to shower Shuja and his family with buckets of money. Shuja, however marries Hira (Armeena Khan), his maternal cousin, with ulterior motives of getting to London through her father, who lives and works there. Although Shuja's decision to marry Hira, is not exactly based on romances initially but him and Hira gradually develop a mutual understanding and deep love for each other over the course of their marriage. Eventually, after a lot of ups and downs, her father finally agrees and gives the news of Shuja's immigration. With a sudden turn of events, day later, Hira's father passes away, because of which Shuja's immigration is inevidently cancelled and he's left hopeless, his hopelessness boiling up frustration every minute. With no other choice in mind, the young lad then decides to travel to London by hook or by crook.

Whilst travelling illegally, Shuja faces a lot of difficult obstacles. It takes a long time to get to London, with many trivial challenges in between, first he goes from Karachi to Iran, then to Turkey, then Greece, then France and finally he arrives at his true destination, London: Shuja, without any other option available to him, has to travel and cannot turn back, or else he shall face death from starvation and other struggles. Shuja travels with a group of men and they all walk from one country to another, thirsty, hungry and very stressed. Unable to quench their thirst or satisfy their hunger, they are threatened by the leader of their association to call their parents and demand for money or else they'll have to die. When the group becomes fully aware of the threatening situations they put themselves in, it is then that they begin to realise, that they must continue and keep on walking, because these terrible circumstances have been brought on to them and have been woven by their own hands. Hiding in lorries and vans, walking miles and more, the group fakes their identity the entire way, knowing fully well what'd happen if they didn't. When the men arrive in Turkey, they are given some food, water and clothes, much to their happiness. Their names are changed and they are given fake passports to continue on faking their identities, this was an extremely important factor that had to be dealt with carefully, otherwise their safety would be at risk and they'd immediately be exposed and deported. With very little understanding of how the world works, Shuja believes that in the West, money grows on trees whilst in the East, it has to be earned with hard work and labour. Contrary to Shuja's personality, his younger brother, Kamran's (Muneeb Butt) ideals are completely opposite to that of his. Kamran works hard and honestly, and despite of his family's circumstances and his younger age, Kamran succeeds far more than Shuja. In due, Shuja and the rest of the men reach Greece, day by day getting closer to their actual destination. Since there was, of course, no source of shelter, the illegal bunch stays in a container for some days. While staying there, Shuja witnesses an untimely death of a woman who had been living in the container for more than 10 days. This makes Shuja extremely terrified and also causes him to feel depressed, his patience at its limit. Meanwhile, in Pakistan, Kamran is offered a visit to Qatar for some days and is in the midst of marrying a girl named Sania (Kinza Hashmi), whose first marriage had been broken off when the groom and his family left because of Sania's father's arrest. Out of sympathy and care for Sania's reputation, Kamran marries her, so that he could save her from a lifetime of insult and mockery.  With a head full of ambitions, Kamran's greedy mother is completely unwilling to marry her son off to someone of the same social status, however his father is extremely pleased with his empathetic and respectful decision.

Shuja finally reaches France. In Pakistan it was heard a truck carrying a container with illegal immigrants like Shuja was fired by soldiers. This makes Shuja's family sad and hopeless. Kamran later discovers from the embassy that Shuja is not dead. In France, Shuja gets in a fight with one of the immigrants who was encouraging him to stay in France and do something better here and forget about London. Shuja later apologizes  him and the immigrant told him three only ways to get to UK.
The first is to go by ferry but you can be easily discovered and be thrown in the sea, the second is to go by walk, which can result in death by a shot from a gun at the border and the third is to travel by hanging under a trailer leaving for London. Shuja chooses the third way because it is impossible to be spotted. Shuja hangs under a food truck and leaves for London.

Shuja finally reaches the destination he longed for, London. He is amazed by the scenery and calls home. His mother receives the call. Shuja later realizes there is nothing to do really here is no one will offer a job because he is illegal. Shuja then meets a man who offers him a job at a hotel for a 1,000 pounds a month. He later realizes the person who applied him the job is trying to use him for something illegal. He leaves him and sleeps in a park. In Pakistan, Kamran is leaving for his flight to Qatar. He hands over some money to Hira because his mother doesn't even allow her to eat a decent amount of food. Sakeena scolds Kamran for not giving her money, but he ignores. In London Shuja cannot find a job and after meeting another Pakistani at a grocery store, he realizes to get a job you need legal documents. He is hopeless and realizes that coming here was a big mistake. Sakeena is very angry at Kamran for leaving her like this and getting married with a middle-class family girl. She wanted someone from a rich family to fulfill her greed. She calls up her friend and finds a family and tells them that Kamran is unmarried. Sania hears the news and is angry to Kamran.

Meanwhile, in London, Shuja tries to find a job but fails. Shuja also gets very hungry in the process. Since he has no money he cannot buy anything. He spots a workshop and mechanics trying to get tires inside the workshop. He offers them a help and he is paid 5 pounds and buys some food with it. In Pakistan, Kamran hears about a marriage proposal her mother did. He returns and meets Sania first and assures her he will never leave her. Then he goes back home asks his mother about the proposal and his mother is shocked because she kept it a secret. For the first time, Kamran's father scolds her and warns that if she does this again, she will be kicked out of the house. In London, Shuja is still trying to find a job. He finally succeeds when he finds a job at a local restaurant owned by a Sikh. He gets a job for 200 pounds a month and is given an apartment but to his dismay, the apartment was already being lived by four other men and the whole building only contained one single bathroom. He soon settles in. The first day of the job did not go well though. Due to being only one bathroom in the building he had to stand In a long queue. He arrived 10 minutes late at his job and 30 pounds were cut from his salary. Soon he also breaks a dish which angers the owner. Shuja soon discovers that the Sikh was also selling drugs secretly. Shuja could not report this to authorities because if they ask his identity he would be captured. So he moves on and tries to fit in his new life.

The scolding Sakeena received did not stop her from trying to separate the couple. She goes to a Black Magician and is given a curse written on a paper. The Magician told here to drop the paper in a glass of water then give it to Kamran. Sania's servant was also present at that time. She reports Sania and then she calls Kamran. Kamran then caught her mother trying to keep the piece of paper in a cup of tea. Hira is still trying to spend life without Shuja as she is always being badly treated by Sakeena. Sakeena took away here phone and often scolds her for no apparent reason. Disturbed by all of this, Hira stays with her mother for some time.

When Kamran comes back from work, his mother is quite questionable to him and asking him how his day is at work while she goes to the kitchen and distracts Tamana (sister) who is getting tea for her brother that Mubashir is crying and she should go to him. Sakina starts doing what the Black Magician told her but Kamran fortunately comes and spots her. He tells his mom this is wrong but he says that if you want me to drink it then fine but he believes in his God that nothing will happen. Sakina says a lie that this paper is not a curse but for him for his success and health. But Kamran knows the truth and doesn't want to embarrass his mother.

Eventually, Shuja realises his mistakes. His tone towards Hira (his wife) is much softer and loving than before. He is very guilty and angry at himself for coming to London because even though his hardworking father has educated him, he cannot get a good job better than the one he has now simply because he has no documents for evidence. Shuja's friend advises him to take another part-time job in the bar with him and so Shuja does. But one day a British friend of his (more like a colleague) forces him to drink and so he gets drunk. Shuja desperately insists he doesn't want to because it is haram in his faith which means it is forbidden to drink in his faith but the person says that if he wants to work in a pub and make drinks, he needs to drink himself.

Meanwhile, a Sikh girl called Preet who protected Shuja in the pub once starts a liking for Shuja. She comes to the pub follows him to the restaurant and gives tips to him and pays the Sikh boss of Shuja for him to be out of work for some time. She is a very wealthy person herself and lives on her own. Shuja's friend advises him to take advantage of this as she wants to marry him and if they paper marry Shuja will become legal. However Shuja doesn't want to because he already has a wife. However, for papers Shuja marries Preet and Preet is somewhat overcontrolling over Shuja; refusing to let him send money back to Pakistan. He eventually calms her but a new dilemma arises - Hira has lost it. Constant breakdowns and uncontrollable anger have drove Sakina crazy and Kamran is taking care of her. She finds out Shuja got married again to Preet. She has lost it with Shuja and his family. Hira's mom tells Hira to give Shuja a divorce, because she says according to her experience they never come back once they go abroad and you are never happy. Shuja is unhappy and depressed with his London life and someone takes Shuja to Faraz - who was assumed dead but he really isn't. He tells Shuja that he told people he was dead because he was involved in illegal drugs and did not want to hurt anyone in his family. He tells Shuja to go back. Shuja is sent back to Pakistan and reaches the divorce court in time, where Hira withdraws her divorce and they live happily ever after.

Cast 
 Zahid Ahmed as Shuja
 Armeena Khan as Hira
 Muneeb Butt as Kamran
 Kinza Hashmi as Sania
 Asma Abbas as Sakina
 Abid Ali as Saadat
 Fazila Qazi as Shaheen
 Zuhab Khan as Imran
 Ahson Talish as Faraz 
 Laila Wasti as Saniya's mother
 Noaman Sami as Fahad
 Sajid Shah as Tahir
 Kubra Khan as Preet Kaur
 Alizeh Shah as Tamanna
 Farah Nadir as Munni
 Sumbul Shahid as Hira's aunt

Production
"It's a very interesting story," Zahid Ahmed told Instep. "It tells the story of a man who belongs to the lower strata of society and wishes to settle in the West through whatever means he can. But once he makes it to the West, life isn't as smooth as he thought it would be. From there on, the narrative takes an interesting turn as he is forced to do things that he doesn't want to." The filming of the travel of Shuja was filmed in each country he went through and the rest was filmed in Pakistan.

Reception 
Daldal was one of the highest rated program of the year it was released. It received high ratings and was a commercial success.

See also 
 2017 in Pakistani television

References

External links 
 

Pakistani drama television series
2017 Pakistani television series debuts
2018 Pakistani television series endings
Urdu-language television shows
Hum TV original programming
Hum TV